GLM may refer to:

Science and Technology 
Generalized linear model, a generalization of ordinary linear regression
General linear model, a generalization of multiple linear regression, special case of above
Generalized Lagrangian mean, a method in continuum mechanics to split a flow field into a mean (average) part and a wave part 
Geostationary Lightning Mapper, an instrument being designed for the GOES-R series of satellites
OpenGL Mathematics, a framework

Companies 
Global Language Monitor, media analytics organization
GlmY RNA or GlmZ RNA

Transport
Gillingham railway station (Kent), Kent, England; National Rail station code GLM
Gilman (Amtrak station), Illinois, United States; Amtrak station code GLM

Other uses
 Grand Officer of the Legion of Merit (Rhodesia) (post-nominal letters), an award in the Rhodesian honours system